Décastar (stylised DECASTAR) is an annual athletics competition that takes place in Talence, in the department of the Gironde in France. Organised by World Athletics, it is one of the athletics meetings that make up the World Athletics Challenge – Combined Events. Male and female athletes compete in the decathlon or heptathlon, respectively, and points scored at the Décastar count towards a yearly total for the parent competition.

History
The Décastar competition was first established in 1976 and, after further editions in 1978 and 1984, it was held annually from 1986 onwards. Since its inception it has become one the premier combined event meetings: the 1996 Olympic champion Dan O'Brien set a world record in the decathlon at the 1992 edition, a mark which went unbeaten for nearly seven years. At the 2004 edition, the organisers included the rarely competed women's decathlon and Marie Collonvillé set the world record with 8150 points.

Competition format

As with most international combined events competitions, the programme is spread over two days.

Records

Winners
Key:

References

External links
Official website 

 
Decathlon
Annual track and field meetings
Athletics competitions in France
Recurring sporting events established in 1976
World Athletics Combined Events Tour
1976 establishments in France